Tactile is a real-time text-to-braille translation device currently under development at the Massachusetts Institute of Technology. It was conceived by a team of undergraduate students, competing as "Team 100% Enthusiasm", during a 15-hour MIT "hackathon". The device is slid over printed text and a camera captures images of the words and sends them to a microcontroller. The information moves the pins up and down, translating the text into Braille. Once on the market it is hoped to be much cheaper than existing devices.

People
The six-person development team comprises Chandani Doshi, Grace Li, Jialin Shi, Bonnie Wang, Charlene Xia, and Tania Yu, all undergraduate students at MIT at the time of Tactile's conception. A joint collaboration in materials science, mechanical and electrical engineering, and computer science, Tactile received popular media attention for its rapid pace of development, as well as its inventors all being women in STEM fields with disproportionally low female representation.

Development
Tactile provides real-time translation of English text, captured by integrated camera, into braille dynamically rendered on a refreshable display. The end product is to display 36 braille characters at a time on a  interface with an intended retail price around US$100. With existing braille display devices priced in the range of $1,500 to $2,500, Tactile has been characterized as a potential "quantum leap forward for the blind community."

The Tactile team was awarded a $10,000 grant in the MIT IDEAS Global Challenge and was accepted into the Microsoft Patent Program, receiving funding and legal counsel from Microsoft to apply for patent protection in the United States. The application was filed on September 16, 2016, and presently has patent pending status.

See also
 Assistive technology

Notes

References

External links 

 

Assistive technology
Braille
Braille technology
Inventions